Appaalissiorfik (old spelling: Agpâligsiorfik) is a former settlement in Avannaata municipality in northwestern Greenland. It was located in the north-central part of Upernavik Archipelago, on the southwestern cape of Qullikorsuit Island, an island in Tasiusaq Bay. The settlement operated between 1916 and 1923.

References 

Former populated places in Greenland
Tasiusaq Bay
Upernavik Archipelago